King Ferdinand may refer to:

Ferdinand I of Aragon (1380–1416)
Ferdinand II of Aragon (1452–1516), also Ferdinand V of Castile and León, Ferdinand "the Catholic", King of Aragon, Sicily ((Trinacria) and in Naples as Ferdinand III), and Navarre, first king of a unified Kingdom of Spain
Ferdinand I of León (died 1065), "the Great"
Ferdinand II of León (1157–1188)
Ferdinand III of Castile ( 1200–1252), "the Saint"
Ferdinand IV of Castile (1285–1312), "the Summoned"
Ferdinand I, Holy Roman Emperor (1503–1564), also Ferdinand I of Bohemia, Hungary and Croatia
Ferdinand II, Holy Roman Emperor (1578–1637), also Ferdinand II of Bohemia, Hungary and Croatia
Ferdinand III, Holy Roman Emperor (1608–1657), also Ferdinand III of Bohemia, Hungary and Croatia
Ferdinand IV, King of the Romans (1633–1654), also King of Bohemia, and King of Hungary and Croatia
Ferdinand I of Austria (1793–1875), also Ferdinand V of Bohemia, Hungary and Croatia
Ferdinand I of Naples (1423–1494)
Ferdinand II of Naples (1495–1496)
Ferdinand I of the Two Sicilies (1751–1825), also Ferdinand IV of Naples, and Ferdinand III of Sicily
Ferdinand II of the Two Sicilies (1810–1856)
Ferdinand VI of Spain (1713–1759)
Ferdinand VII of Spain (1784–1833)
Ferdinand I of Portugal (1345–1383)
Ferdinand II of Portugal (1816–1885)
Ferdinand I of Romania (1865–1927)
Ferdinand I of Bulgaria (1861–1948)